Albert Magnin (April 13, 1846 - March 18, 1906) was an American politician from Pennsylvania who served as a Republican member of the Pennsylvania House of Representatives for Delaware County from 1889 to 1892.

Early life and military service
Magnin was born in Philadelphia, Pennsylvania.  He served in the Pennsylvania Volunteer Infantry division during the U.S. Civil War in the following capacities:
Sergeant, Company D, 26th Regiment from 1861-1864
Sergeant, Company C, 99th Regiment from 1864-1865
Second Lieutenant, Company F, 203rd Regiment in 1865

On September 11, 1889, Captain Magnin was the keynote speaker at the dedication of a regimental monument for the 99th Pennsylvania Infantry at the portion of the Gettysburg battlefield known as the Devil's Den.

Career
Magnin worked as a farmer and as editor and proprietor of the Darby Progress newspaper.

He was elected to the Pennsylvania House of Representatives for Delaware County and served from 1889 to 1892.

Magnin served as Postmaster for the United States Postal Service in Darby, Pennsylvania from 1900 to 1906.

Personal life
Magnin was married to Ellen Jane (Fielding) Magnin and together they had 4 sons and 3 daughters.  He died in Darby, Pennsylvania and was interred at the Arlington Cemetery in Drexel Hill, Pennsylvania.

References

1846 births
1906 deaths
19th-century American newspaper editors
19th-century American politicians
Burials at Arlington Cemetery (Pennsylvania)
Editors of Pennsylvania newspapers
Republican Party members of the Pennsylvania House of Representatives
Pennsylvania postmasters
People of Pennsylvania in the American Civil War
Union Army officers